School District 85 Vancouver Island North is a school district in British Columbia. It is based in the town of Port Hardy. It provides service to the communities northern tip of Vancouver Island including Port McNeill and Woss as well as the adjacent smaller islands such as Alert Bay.

Schools

See also
List of school districts in British Columbia

85